"I Walk the Line" is a 1956 song written by Johnny Cash

I Walk the Line may also refer to:
 I Walk the Line (1964 album), an album by Johnny Cash
 I Walk the Line (film), a 1970 film directed by John Frankenheimer
 I Walk the Line (soundtrack album), with songs by Johnny Cash
 "I Walk the Line Revisited", a 2001 song by Rodney Crowell featuring Johnny Cash

See also
 Walk the Line (disambiguation)